

The Potez 60 sometimes named the Sauterelle ("Grasshopper") is a French 1930s parasol-wing open-cockpit trainer. It had a wide-track tailwheel landing gear and is powered by a 45 kW (60 hp) Potez 3B uncowled radial engine. An order for 250 was placed by the French government, but deliveries stopped after 155 aircraft were produced.

Specifications

References

 

1930s French civil trainer aircraft
060
Parasol-wing aircraft
Single-engined tractor aircraft
Aircraft first flown in 1935